The Murray River is a major river in the Australian states of New South Wales, Victoria, and South Australia.

Murray River may also refer to:

Australia
 Murray River Council, a local government area in New South Wales
 Murray River Flag, a river navigation flag
 Murray River National Park, a protected area in South Australia
 Murray River turtle, a river turtle
 Murray River (Queensland), the river of the Murray Falls in Queensland
 Murray River (Western Australia), a minor river in Western Australia

Canada
 Murray River (British Columbia), a river of British Columbia
 Murray River, Prince Edward Island, a town

New Zealand
 Murray River (New Zealand), a minor river on Stewart Island/Rakiura

See also 
 Little Murray River (disambiguation)
 Lake Murray (disambiguation)
 Murray (disambiguation)
 Murray Bridge (disambiguation)